"Gears of War" is a song by the American thrash metal band Megadeth. It was released as a promotional single off of their tenth studio album United Abominations (2007). It was the first song from the album released. An instrumental of the song is featured in the 2006 video game of the same name.

Background 
"Gears of War" is featured on the soundtrack to the video game Gears of War. Initially, the song had no lyrics; however, Microsoft approached Megadeth, asking to use the song in Gears of War. The band accepted the offer and wrote lyrics for the song, but it was too late to use the lyrics in the version for the game, as the game was near completion. The lyrics were written about the Bosnian War. 

A demo of the song was released on the band's website on November 22, 2006.

Live performance 
The band debuted the song on October 17, 2006 in Nagoya, Japan. Megadeth performed the track live as headliners of Gigantour, a twenty-five stop metal tour sponsored by Microsoft as part of the promotion for the game. Microsoft held a contest which, if won, you would get to try the game early, and would have the opportunity to see a private concert, which the song's American live debut was.

Personnel  
Production and performance credits are adapted from United Abominations liner notes.
Megadeth
Dave Mustaine – guitars, lead vocals
Glen Drover – guitars, backing vocals
James LoMenzo – bass, backing vocals
Shawn Drover – drums, backing vocals
Additional musicians
Chris Rodriguez – backing vocals
Axel Mackenrott – keyboards
Production
Dave Mustaine – production
Jeff Balding – production, recording
Andy Sneap – production, mixing, mastering, recording

References 

Gears of War
2006 songs
2006 singles
2007 songs
Megadeth songs
Songs written by Dave Mustaine
Music based on video games
Roadrunner Records singles